Vidyasagar University was established by an Act of the West Bengal legislature which was notified in the Calcutta Gazette on 24 June 1981.  It is an affiliating  university in Paschim Medinipur district of southern West Bengal, India. It offers courses at the undergraduate and post-graduate levels.

It was founded by the mathematician and statistician from the University of Cambridge, Anil Kumar Gain.

History
The university was established on 29 September 1981 by the Vidyasagar University Act 1981 (West Bengal Act XVIII of 1981) of the state of West Bengal to commemorate Pandit Iswar Chandra Bandyopadhyay, also known as Ishwar Chandra Vidyasagar, an educationist and social worker of 19th century Bengal. The University Grants Commission accorded recognition to the university under Section 12 B on 1 March 1990.

A short history of Vidyasagar University is written by a faculty of the Anthropology Department in Bengali which was published in January 2001 from Kolkata. In this book the author being one of the founder teachers of the university narrated the missions of the institution as well as the deviations and the future possibilities in the context of globalization.

Prof. Anil Kumar Gayen: Founder

Anil Kumar Gayen, FRS (1 February 1919 – 7 February 1978) was an Indian mathematician and statistician best known for his works on the Pearson product-moment correlation coefficient in the field of applied statistics, with his colleague Sir Ronald Fisher. He received his Ph.D. from the University of Cambridge under the supervision of Henry Ellis Daniels, who was the president of the Royal Statistical Society. He was honoured as a Fellow of the Royal Statistical Society and the famous Cambridge Philosophical Society.

Gayen was the president of the Statistics section of the Indian Science Congress Association, as well as the head of the Department of Mathematics at the Indian Institute of Technology Kharagpur. He went on to found Vidyasagar University, naming it after the famous social reformer of the Bengali Renaissance, Ishwar Chandra Vidyasagar.

Gayen dedicated the later years of his life towards the establishment of Vidyasagar University as a non-traditional institution of higher education in the erstwhile Medinipur district of the West Bengal state in India.  Professor Anil Kumar Gayen’s vision was clearly reflected in the Vidyasagar University Act of 1981 wherein among others, it was stated that the "University shall have the power to make such academic studies as may contribute to the improvement of economic conditions and welfare of the people in general and the tribal people in particular" (Vidyasagar University Act 1981 amended in 1997 and 2011.)

The Ghani Committee appointed by the U.G.C. suggested, among others, setting up of a university in Midnapore on the ground of its ‘having a compact area and a manageable number of colleges’ (at that time there were 36 colleges with an enrolment of about 42,000), and of its ‘having the great advantage of co-operation of the IIT, Kharagpur. The committee was also of the opinion that the new University would develop on the lines suited to the needs of this backward area. The recognition of Gayen as the founder of Vidyasagar University was belated. After three decades of its establishment in the Seventh Executive Council meeting held on 04.05.2012 based on the proposal of a professor of Anthropology a committee was formed to honour the founder of the university.

Establishment 
Following the approval of UGC, the Government of West Bengal decided in 1978 to establish Vidyasagar University and, in consultation with the U.G.C., the State Government appointed a Planning Committee in March 1979 to lay down the lines of development and to take initial steps to found the university. The committee submitted its report in October. Then the Vidyasagar University Act, 1981 (West Bengal Act XVIII of 1981) was passed in the State Legislative Assembly. Professor Bhupesh Chandra Mukherjee, a former teacher of History of the then Presidency College, Kolkata, joined as the first vice chancellor on 29 September 1981. Professor B.C. Mukherjee wrote an article in the Journal of Higher Education(published by the UGC) in which he stated the mission and objectives of Vidyasagar University and mentioned the name of the founder of VU—Professor Anil Kumar Gain.

Academic activities started when through a Notification [no. 983-Edn (U), dated Calcutta 23 May] issued by the State Government, 30 colleges of the District of Midnapore were affiliated to the Vidyasagar University with effect from 1 June 1985. The foundation stone of the main campus (at Tantigaria mouza of Midnapore Sadar Town for post graduate teaching and central administration) was laid on 18 July 1983 by the Hon’ble Chancellor of the university and governor of West Bengal, B.D. Pande. On 15 January 1986, it was inaugurated by Shri Jyoti Basu, the then chief minister of West Bengal.

On 16 January classes commenced in six post graduate departments: Anthropology, Applied Mathematics with Oceanology and Computer Programming, Commerce with Farm Management, Economics with Rural Development, Library and Information Science, Political Science with Rural Administration.

The U.G.C. accorded recognition to the university in terms of Section 12B of the U.G.C. Act, on 1 March 1990. The university houses 27 PG departments (apart from MBA which is run under the Department of Commerce with Farm Management), 12 in Humanities and 15 in Science while 46 undergraduate colleges apart from 11 courses in yet 11 other colleges / institutes are affiliated to it. Fourteen vocational subjects and six other specialized courses are offered at the UG level. The overall emphasis of the university is not to perpetuate the traditional nature of the other universities of West Bengal but to merge as a distinctive entity with a special nature of its own. The National Assessment and Accreditation Council (NAAC) awarded Vidyasagar University a three-star status.

The campus has a picturesque background within which afforestation programmes are being undertaken.

Campus
It may be distributed as:
 Main Campus: 
 Residential Campus: 
 Third plot:  The third plotwhich was given by the district administration was taken back since the university could not use it for its purpose.

Organisation and administration

Governance
The Vice-chancellor of Vidyasagar University is the chief executive officer of the university. In 2015 Ranjan Chakrabarti was appointed as Vice-chancellor of the university.

Faculties and Departments
Vidyasagar University has 29 departments organized into two faculties: Science and Arts & Commerce.

 Faculty of Science

This faculty consists of the departments of Applied Mathematics with Oceanology and Computer Programming, Physics, Chemistry, Anthropology, Fishery Sciences, Botany and Forestry,  Biomedical Laboratory Science and Technology, Clinical Nutrition and Dietetics, Computer Science, Human Physiology,  Electronics, Geography, Microbiology, Remote Sensing & GIS, and Zoology

 Faculty of Arts & Commerce

This faculty consists of the departments of Bengali, English, Hindi, Sanskrit, Santali, History, Political Science, Philosophy, Economics, Library and Information Science, Sociology, Commerce, and Business Administration.

Centres
 Women's Studies Centre
 University Scientific Instrumentation Centre (USIC)
 Gandhian Study Centre
 Computer Centre
 Social Research Centre
 Centre for Adivasi Studies and Museum
 Centre for Environmental Studies
 Centre for Life Sciences
 Centre for Continuing and Adult Education

Affliations
The university is an affiliating institution and has its jurisdiction over Purba Medinipur and Paschim Medinipur districts or any district which may be created in future out of any parts thereof. Thirty colleges of the University of Calcutta in the erstwhile district of Midnapore were initially deemed to be affiliated to Vidyasagar University.

Vidyasagar University Teachers'Association (VUTA) 
The professors of Vidyasagar University formed their association in 1986 with nine teachers of the six postgraduate departments. Gradually the organization developed into a viable entity. Apart from looking into the pure financial and promotional interests of the teachers, the association regularly organizes academic seminars and cultural programmes in which many students and other members of the university community participate. On 24 July 2013 VUTA celebrated its belated silver jubilee function and published a souvenir. The organization got its registration in 2015. On 4 December 2015, and for the first time in the history of the association, a Professor in Anthropology wrote an open letter to the President of the association pointing out the anomalies in the study leave rules for the teachers.

Academics

Admission
Admission in undergraduate and postgraduate course is mainly based on the result of higher secondary (10+2) and graduation (10+2+3) level results, respectively. Each college sets up their own criteria for admission in undergraduate course, but all are mainly based on higher secondary results.

For research level programs, the aspirants have to sit for a qualifying test (RET) followed by an interview. It is mandatory that they secure at least 55% marks in their post graduate level examination.

If the aspirants qualify the all India examination like NET, GATE, SET then their admission in Ph.D is only based on interview.

Distance education
Vidyasagar University has a Directorate of Distance Education (DDE, VU) for conducting post graduate studies in distance mode. This is for people who cannot undergo post graduate studies in regular (full-time) mode. The DDE, VU is on the main campus.

It was established in 1994 and started offering correspondence courses in postgraduate subjects from the session 1994-1995. Candidates pursuing distance learning courses are provided with study materials in modules on topics prescribed in the syllabus. The Directorate of Distance Education organises the Personal Contact Programme (PCP) for interaction with leading academic experts in the subjects who give counselling and advice rather than classroom lectures. PCPs are held ordinarily during Summer Recess, Puja Recess and Winter Recess and on holidays. Courses of distance education in the university are approved by the University Grants Commission (UGC) and the Distance Education Council.

Computer Centre
Computer centre takes an important role for spreading the knowledge of computer education in rural areas of West Bengal. They offers certificate and diploma courses on computer-based subjects like Office Automation and Financial Accounting, Office Automation and Internet Technologies. They offered few post graduate diploma courses in collaboration with CMC. It maintains the campus-wide LAN (optical fiber based GBIC) with 400 nodes throughout the campus and providing Internet services.

Sports and games
Games and sports of the university are an integral part of academic achievements. Sports events like Athletics, Football, Volleyball, Kho-Kho, Swimming, Kabadi, and Cricket competitions are  organised regularly as per the university's Sports Calendar. The university has shown remarkable performance in All India Inter-University tournaments and all Bengal Inter-University tournaments even with limited infrastructural facilities.

Accreditation
Vidyasagar University has been awarded B grade by the National Assessment and Accreditation Council (NAAC). In the third cycle of accreditation by NAAC, Vidyasagar University has been awarded a cumulative grade point average (CPGA) of 2.86 and was placed under B Grade.

Publishing
The faculties of Vidyasagar University and its vice-chancellors have written and edited a books on subjects mainly by availing financial grant from the UGC Unassigned grant scheme.

The academic departments have been publishing journals. There are two multidisciplinary journals: one published by the biological science departments and the other by the physical science departments.

Notable alumni
There is an alumni association of Vidyasagar University, established in 2000.

 Manas Kumar Santra, chemical biologist, N-Bios laureate

See also
 List of universities in India
 Universities and colleges in India
 Education in India
 Distance Education Council
 University Grants Commission (India)

References

External links

  
 

 
Educational institutions established in 1981
Universities and colleges in Paschim Medinipur district
1981 establishments in West Bengal